Châtelaudren-Plouagat is a commune in the Côtes-d'Armor department of Brittany in northwestern France. It was established on 1 January 2019 by merger of the former communes of Plouagat (the seat) and Châtelaudren.

Population

See also
Communes of the Côtes-d'Armor department

References

Communes of Côtes-d'Armor
Communes nouvelles of Côtes-d'Armor
Populated places established in 2019
2019 establishments in France